Sonja Amalie Steffen (born 22 October 1963) is a German lawyer and politician of the Social Democratic Party (SPD) who served as a member of the Bundestag from the state of Mecklenburg-Vorpommern from 2009 to 2021.

Early life and education 
Born in Dreiborn, North Rhine-Westphalia, Steffen studied law at the University of Cologne.

Political career 
Steffen became member of the Bundestag in the 2009 German federal election. 

In parliament, Steffen was a member of the Committee on Legal Affairs and Consumer Protection; its Sub-Committee on European Affairs; the Committee on the Verification of Credentials and Immunities; and the Budget Committee. In her capacity as member of the Budget Committee, she served as her parliamentary group's rapporteur on the annual budgets of the Federal Ministry for Economic Cooperation and Development (since 2014) and the Federal Ministry of Health (since 2018).

In 2018, Steffen also joined the parliamentary body in charge of appointing judges to the Highest Courts of Justice, namely the Federal Court of Justice (BGH), the Federal Administrative Court (BVerwG), the Federal Fiscal Court (BFH), the Federal Labour Court (BAG), and the Federal Social Court (BSG).

In February 2020, Steffen announced that she would not stand in the 2021 federal elections but instead resign from active politics by the end of the parliamentary term.

Other activities 
 Magnus Hirschfeld Foundation, Alternate Member of the Board of Trustees
 German Corporation for International Cooperation (GIZ), Member of the Supervisory Board (since 2014)
 Ozeaneum, Member of the Supervisory Board

References

External links 

  
 Bundestag biography 

1963 births
Living people
Members of the Bundestag for Mecklenburg-Western Pomerania
Female members of the Bundestag
21st-century German women politicians
Members of the Bundestag 2017–2021
Members of the Bundestag 2013–2017
Members of the Bundestag 2009–2013
Members of the Bundestag for the Social Democratic Party of Germany